Sungold or Sun Gold may refer to:

Plants
 Sungold apricot
 Sungold, a variety of cherry tomato
 Sungold Chamaecyparis pisifera
 Sungold Prunus mandshurica

Places
 Sungold Hill, James Ross Island, Antarctic Peninsula
 Premier Speedway Sungold Stadium, also known as Sungold Milk Stadium, a dirt track oval in Warrnambool, Australia

Product brands and companies
 SunGold kiwifruit from Zespri
 SunGold Foods from Fargo, North Dakota which makes SunButter
 SunGold tea drink brand from Kroger
 Sungold dairy products from Saputo Inc.
 Warrnambool Cheese and Butter, subsidiary of Saputo
 Sun Gold from Bidco Africa
 Sungold color from Product Miniature Company

Other uses
 Sungold, a play by Irene N. Watts
 Tsornin, translates to "sungold", a fictional horse in the novel The Blue Sword by Robin McKinley